José Humberto Rujano Guillen (born 18 February 1982) is a Venezuelan road bicycle racer who competed professionally between 2003 and 2013, and most recently competed for Venezuelan amateur team Osorio Grupo Ciclismo.

Career
Born in Santa Cruz de Mora, Mérida, Rujano made his debut in the professional peloton in 2003 with the  team. In 2005 Rujano had his best year to date, finishing third in the Giro d'Italia and winning the mountains classification. In 2006 he left the Colombia-Selle Italia team for Quick Step and he moved to the Spanish ProTour team Caisse d'Epargne in 2008. His results were not up to the expectations of team leaders, who did not renew his contract at the end of the season. In 2010, Rujano joined the Italian Professional Continental team ISD-Neri. He was not selected for the Giro d'Italia, his main objective for the season, so he left the team in May and returned to Venezuela.

Androni Giocattoli (2011–12)
At the end of 2010, Rujano signed a contract for two years with the Italian team Androni Giocattoli, directed by Gianni Savio who said that he "believed in his talent" and wanted "to revive his career." Rujano was recruited at the same time as the Italian climber Emanuele Sella, Savio referring to giving these two riders a "last chance".

His main objective for 2011 was the Giro d'Italia, and especially its mountain stages. He lived up to his objectives since he prevailed on 2 mountain stages in the race: stage 9 from Messina to Etna after original winner Alberto Contador was removed from the rankings due to a doping affair and stage 13 from Spilimbergo to Grossglockner, while finishing sixth in the overall classification.

In the 2012 Giro d'Italia, Rujano pulled out of the race, reportedly suffering from mononucleosis.

Vacansoleil–DCM (2013)
Rujano left  at the end of 2012, and joined  for the 2013 season.

Major results
Source: 

2002
 3rd Overall Vuelta al Táchira
1st Stage 13
2003
 1st Stage 4 Clásico RCN
2004
 1st  Overall Vuelta al Táchira
1st Mountains classification
1st Young rider classification
1st Stages 5 & 13 (ITT)
 2nd  Time trial, Pan American Road Championships
 3rd Overall Vuelta a Venezuela
1st Young rider classification
2005
 1st  Overall Vuelta al Táchira
1st Mountains classification
1st Stages 6, 7 & 13 (ITT)
 1st  Overall Clásico Ciclístico Banfoandes
1st Points classification
1st Stages 4, 7 & 8 (ITT)
 2nd Overall Tour de Langkawi
 3rd Overall Giro d'Italia
1st  Mountains classification
1st Combativity classification
1st Stage 19
 3rd Giro d'Oro
 8th Overall Giro del Trentino
2006
 7th Giro dell'Appennino
2007
 1st  Time trial, National Road Championships
2008
 5th Prueba Villafranca de Ordizia
 6th Overall Deutschland Tour
 6th Subida a Urkiola
2009
 1st  Time trial, National Road Championships
 1st  Overall Vuelta a Colombia
1st Stages 6, 8, 10 & 14 (ITT)
 1st  Overall Vuelta a Venezuela
1st Stages 8 & 9
 9th Overall Vuelta al Táchira
1st Stages 7, 10 & 11 (ITT)
2010
 1st  Overall Vuelta al Táchira
1st Stage 8 (ITT)
 1st  Overall Tour de Langkawi
1st Stage 6
 1st Stage 7 Vuelta a Venezuela
 3rd Overall Vuelta a Colombia
1st Stage 9
2011
 1st Stage 1b (TTT) Settimana Internazionale di Coppi e Bartali
 5th Giro dell'Appennino
 6th Overall Giro d'Italia
1st Stages 9 & 13
 8th Overall Giro del Trentino
 9th Overall Vuelta a Venezuela
2012
 2nd Overall Tour de Langkawi
 5th Overall Giro del Trentino
 9th Overall Settimana Internazionale di Coppi e Bartali
2013
 1st  Time trial, National Road Championships
2014
 2nd Time trial, National Road Championships
2015
 1st  Overall Vuelta al Táchira
1st  Mountains classification
1st Stage 6
 2nd Time trial, National Road Championships
 6th Time trial, Pan American Road Championships
 7th Overall Vuelta a Colombia
2016
 Pan American Road Championships
6th Road race
10th Time trial
2019
 5th Overall Vuelta a Venezuela
 10th Overall Tour de Guadeloupe

Grand Tour general classification results timeline

Notes

References

External links

1982 births
Living people
People from Mérida (state)
Venezuelan male cyclists
Venezuelan Giro d'Italia stage winners
Vuelta a Colombia stage winners
Vuelta a Venezuela stage winners